Courtney Kresten Winnaar (born 27 March 1997) is a South African rugby union player for the  in the Pro14. He can play as a fullback or fly-half.

Rugby career

2013–15: Schoolboy rugby

In 2013, he represented the team at the Under-16 Grant Khomo Week held in Vanderbijlpark, scoring one try in the tournament in their 15–13 victory over Free State. He played in the premier South African high schools competition, the Under-18 Craven Week, in both 2014 and 2015.

2016: Eastern Province Kings

In 2016, Winnaar joined the Eastern Province Academy. He was included in the squad for the  – a university rugby team that is affiliated with Eastern Province's Academy – for the 2016 Varsity Cup. He was named on the bench for their match against  in Johannesburg, but failed to make an appearance.

Winnaar was amongst a large contingent of youngsters that were included in the  squad for the 2016 Currie Cup qualification series. He kicked two penalties in the first half of the match and scored his first senior try just before the hour mark in an eventual 18–37 defeat.

After those four Currie Cup appearances, Winnaar joined the  team for their 2016 Under-19 Provincial Championship campaign.

2017–2018: Sharks
In 2017 Winnaar was voted Sharks Under 21 Player of the Year

References

1997 births
Living people
Eastern Province Elephants players
Rugby union fly-halves
Rugby union fullbacks
Rugby union players from East London, Eastern Cape
South African rugby union players
Southern Kings players
Sharks (Currie Cup) players
Sharks (rugby union) players
Rugby union wings
Tel Aviv Heat players
South African expatriate sportspeople in Israel
South African expatriate rugby union players
Expatriate rugby union players in Israel